Andrews may refer to:

Places

Australia
Andrews, Queensland
Andrews, South Australia

United States
Andrews, Florida (disambiguation), various places
Andrews, Indiana
Andrews, Nebraska
Andrews, North Carolina
Andrews, Oregon
Andrews, South Carolina
Andrews, Texas
Andrews County, Texas
Andrews Air Force Base near Washington, D.C., home of Air Force One
Andrews University (Michigan)

Philippines
Andrews Avenue, a major thoroughfare in Metro Manila, Philippines

Other
Andrews (surname)
Andrews v Law Society of British Columbia, a 1989 Supreme Court of Canada case on constitutional equality guarantees 
Joseph Andrews, a novel by Henry Fielding
An Apology for the Life of Mrs. Shamela Andrews, a parody novel
Andrews, a bus company in Sheffield, South Yorkshire, England, that merged with Yorkshire Traction
Andrews Osborne Academy, a private school in Willoughby, Ohio
Henry Cranke Andrews (fl. 1794 – 1830), English botanist (standard author abbreviation Andrews)

See also
Andrewsville, Ontario, Canada
Justice Andrews (disambiguation)
St Andrews (disambiguation)